Zhizdra is a town in Zhizdrinsky District of Kaluga Oblast, Russia.

Zhizdra may also refer to:
Zhizdra Urban Settlement, a municipal formation which the town of Zhizdra in Zhizdrinsky District of Kaluga Oblast, Russia is incorporated as
Zhizdra (river), a river in Kaluga Oblast, Russia